A&R is a common abbreviation for artists and repertoire.

A&R may also refer to:

 A & R Recording, a New York recording studio
 Angus & Robertson, an Australian bookseller